Qatada or Qatadah is an Arabic name. It may refer to:

 Abu Qatada al-Filistini (Omar Mahmoud Othman), Salafi cleric and alleged terrorist
 Abu Qatadah ibn Rab'i al-Ansari (7th century), known as Abu Qatadah, a companion of the Muslim prophet Muhammad
 Qatada ibn al-Nu'man (c.581–c.644), a companion of the Muslim prophet Muhammad
 Qatāda ibn Di'āma (8th century), Hadiths narrator
 Qatadah ibn Idris (1130–1220), Sharif of Mecca and founder of the Banu Qatada dynasty